The dark toadfish (Neophrynichthys latus) is a species of marine ray-finned fish belonging to the family Psychrolutidae, the fatheads and toadfishes. This fish is found on the continental shelf around New Zealand.

References

 Tony Ayling & Geoffrey Cox, Collins Guide to the Sea Fishes of New Zealand,  (William Collins Publishers Ltd, Auckland, New Zealand 1982) 

Psychrolutidae
Endemic marine fish of New Zealand
Fish described in 1875